Beverley Tucker may refer to:
 Nathaniel Beverley Tucker (1784–1851), American judge and legal scholar who often went by his middle name
 Nathaniel Beverley Tucker (journalist) (1820–1890), American editor, printer and diplomat
 Beverley D. Tucker (1846–1930), second bishop of the Episcopal Diocese of Southern Virginia
 Beverley Dandridge Tucker Jr. (1882–1969), sixth bishop of the Episcopal Diocese of Ohio